Aleksey Fedorchenko (born 1966) is a film director from Yekaterinburg, Russia who won accolades at the Venice Film Festival with the mockumentary First on the Moon (2005) and later with Silent Souls (2010), a magical realist tale about the long-extinct Finnic tribe of Merya. His 2012 film Celestial Wives of the Meadow Mari has been selected to be screened in the Vanguard section at the 2013 Toronto International Film Festival.

As of 2013, Fedorchenko was involved in producing Space Mowgli, an adaptation of a science fiction novella by the Strugatsky brothers. 

Fedorchenko's film Anna's War won the Russian Golden Eagle Award in the Best Film category. He also won the award for Best Director.

Filmography
First on the Moon (2005) 
Silent Souls (2010)
Celestial Wives of the Meadow Mari (2012) 
Anna's War (2018)
The Last Darling Bulgaria (2021)

References

External links
 
 

1966 births
Russian film directors
Mass media people from Yekaterinburg
Living people